Golden Princess may refer to one of the following ships:

 , in service with Princess Cruise Line between 1993 and 1997
 , operated under this name between 2000 and 2009
 , in service with Princess Cruise Line between 2001 and 2020

Ship names